The Roaring Meg hydro scheme refers to two small hydro electricity power stations fed by the Roaring Meg Dam. The scheme is located next to the Roaring Meg Stream in the Kawarau Gorge, near Cromwell, New Zealand. Roaring Meg is owned and operated by Pioneer Energy.

History
The scheme was built by the Otago Central Power Board starting in 1934 and commissioned 1936, at a cost of 40,000 pounds. At times the lower station has been flooded by the Kawarau River.

Layout
The intake flows into a series of pipes connected to the power stations. The upper station discharges into both a pipe feeding the lower station and the Roaring Meg Stream, while the lower station discharges into the Kawarau River.

Performance

Lower Roaring Meg station:
 Two turbines
 Operating Head 
 Combined Output 
 Flow 1300 litres per second

Upper Roaring Meg station:
 Two turbines
 Operating Head 
 Combined Output 
 Flow 1300 litres per second

References

External links

Buildings and structures in Otago